Juan de Ribera (Seville, Spain, 20 March 1532 – Valencia, 6 January 1611) was an influential figure in 16th and 17th century Spain.  Ribera held appointments as Archbishop and Viceroy of Valencia, Latin Patriarchate of Antioch, Commander in Chief, president of the Audiencia, and Chancellor of the University of Valencia.  He was beatified in 1796 and canonized by Pope John XXIII in 1960.

Biography
Juan de Ribera's father was Pedro Afán de Ribera, Viceroy of Naples and Duke of Alcala. His mother died when he was very young. 

Ribera studied at the University of Salamanca. Ordained as priest in 1557, Pope Pius IV appointed him Bishop of Badajoz on 27 May 1562 at the age of 30.  There he dedicated himself to teaching the catechism to Roman Catholics and counteracting Protestantism. He was appointed as the Archbishop of Valencia on 3 December 1568. In 1599 he ordained Alfonso Coloma as Bishop of Barcelona. King Philip III of Spain later appointed him Viceroy of Valencia in 1602, and thus he became both the religious and the civil authority.  In this role he founded the Museum of the Patriarch, known among Valencians as the College of Saint John, entrusted to the formation of priests according to the spirit and the dispositions of the Council of Trent.

Expulsion of the Moriscos

As archbishop, Ribera dealt with the issue of Valencia's large Morisco population, descendants of Muslims who converted to Christianity at threat of exile.  The Moriscos had been kept separate from the main population by a variety of decrees that prohibited them from holding public office, entering the priesthood, or taking certain other positions; as a result, the Moriscos had maintained their own culture rather than assimilated.  Some of them did, in fact, still practice forms of crypto-Islam.

Ribera despised the Moriscos as heretics and traitors, a dislike he shared with much of Valencia's Christian populace.  With the Duke of Lerma, Ribera helped convince Philip III to at least expel the Moriscos instead. Ribera helped sell the plan by noting that all the property of the Moriscos could be impounded to provide money for the treasury.  In 1609, the expulsion of the Moriscos from Spain was decreed.  Ribera's original proposal was in fact more extreme: he favored enslaving the entire Morisco population for work in galleys, mines, and abroad.  Ribera said that Philip III could do so "without any scruples of conscience," but this proposal was rejected. If the Moriscos were to be expelled, Ribera favored enslaving and Christianizing at least the children of the Moriscos "for the good of their souls" and exiling the parents.  This was also rejected, though children under 16 years of age who wished to remain in Spain were allowed, an offer very few took.

Canonization
Efforts to canonize Ribera, who himself had been active in attempting to canonize Ignatius of Loyola, began shortly after his death.  Two concerns were raised about his possible sainthood: his failure to hold a provincial council as mandated by the Council of Trent, and his role in the expulsion of the Moriscos.  His supporters played up Ribera's adherence to other parts of the Council of Trent, and tried to present the Moriscos as unconvertible ("[His conversion attempts] had no more effect on the Moriscos as if they had been stones").  Still, efforts proceeded apace, with various admiring biographies (vidas) of Ribera being published.  Ribera was beatified in 1796.  In 1960, his canonization was completed under the auspices of Pope John XXIII.

References 

 Patron Saint's index
 

1532 births
1611 deaths
Clergy from Seville
16th-century Roman Catholic archbishops in Spain
17th-century Roman Catholic archbishops in Spain
Viceroys of Valencia
Spanish Roman Catholic saints
University of Salamanca alumni
16th-century Christian saints
Canonizations by Pope John XXIII
16th-century Roman Catholic bishops in Spain
Beatifications by Pope Pius VI